Maureen Tranter married name Maureen Dorothy Taylor, (born 7 May 1947) is a British sprinter.

Athletics career
She competed in the women's 200 metres at the 1968 Summer Olympics.

She represented England and won a silver medal in the 4 x 110 yards relay, at the 1966 British Empire and Commonwealth Games in Kingston, Jamaica.

Four years later she competed in the 200 and 400 metres in the 1970 British Commonwealth Games in Edinburgh, Scotland.

References

External links
 

1947 births
Living people
Athletes (track and field) at the 1968 Summer Olympics
British female sprinters
Olympic athletes of Great Britain
Commonwealth Games medallists in athletics
Athletes (track and field) at the 1966 British Empire and Commonwealth Games
Athletes (track and field) at the 1970 British Commonwealth Games
Commonwealth Games silver medallists for England
Olympic female sprinters
Medallists at the 1966 British Empire and Commonwealth Games